The Romance of Maoriland was a 1930 New Zealand film, intended to be New Zealand's first "talkie" film with Ted Coubray’s Coubraytone sound system, though also having intertitles.  The film was registered with the Chief Censor on 14 August 1930, but was never released.

Producer and director Edward T. Brown had purchased some footage from the 1923 film The Birth of New Zealand. Several episodes included pre-European culture, the signing of the Treaty of Waitangi and a robbery and kidnapping in the Gabriel's Gully goldfields. The holdup of a Cobb & Co coach incorporated stock Western cliches according to Sam Edwards; masked robbers, the driver holding his hands high and jewellery ripped from women passengers.

Cast
The cast included Patch Mason, Tom Campbell and apparently Stella Southern as the mother of a boy passenger kidnapped during the holdup episode.

References
New Zealand Film 1912-1996 by Helen Martin & Sam Edwards p43 (1997, Oxford University Press, Auckland) 

1930 films
1930s New Zealand films
1930s historical drama films
Films set in New Zealand
1930 drama films
Films shot in New Zealand
New Zealand historical drama films
1930s English-language films